When released in 1999, Elastica's 6 Track EP was the first new material issued by the band since their self-titled debut four years earlier. According to bandleader Justine Frischmann the EP represented more of a document of what the band was up to during the interim rather than a return to form: "The material has been chosen to allow people to hear rarities and demos which reflect all stages of the bands recording between 1996 and 1999. The EP is certainly not intended to be some big comeback record." Indeed, several of the songs would later find themselves on their second album The Menace (2000) although in more polished form.

Mark E. Smith duets with Frischmann on "How He Wrote Elastica Man."

Track listing
 "How He Wrote Elastica Man" (Julia Nagle, Mark E. Smith) – 2:02
 "Nothing Stays the Same" (Donna's Home Demo) (Matthews) – 2:37
 "Miami Nice" (Home Recording) (Elastica, Hardy) – 3:22
 "KB" (Elastica) – 3:12
 "Operate" (Live) (Matthews) – 3:25
 "Generator" (Elastica) – 1:51

Personnel 
Elastica
 Justine Frischmann – vocals, guitar
 Donna Matthews – guitar, vocals
 Annie Holland – bass
 Justin Welch – drums
 Paul Jones – lead guitar
 Mew – keyboards, vocals
 Dave Bush – keyboards, loops

References

Elastica albums
1999 debut EPs